Pitzer is a surname, and may refer to:

Alexander White Pitzer (1834–1927), American Presbyterian clergyman
Kenneth Sanborn Pitzer (1914–1997), American theoretical chemist
Russell Kelly Pitzer (1878–1978), American businessman and philanthropist
Russell Mosher Pitzer (1938-), American theoretical chemist
William Bruce Pitzer (1917–1966), American Naval officer

See also
Pitzer College, liberal arts college located in Claremont, California, United States, named after Russell K. Pitzer
Pitzer equations, thermodynamic equations named after Kenneth S. Pitzer